Draco jareckii  is a species of flying lizard from the family Agamidae. Like all members of the genus Draco, males possess a dulap for displaying and pseudo-wings for gliding from high places though it is not actually capable of powered flight.  The species is identified as not in need of specialized conservation actions and labeled of "Least Concern" by the IUCN. It is endemic to the Philippines.

References 

jareckii
Endemic fauna of the Philippines
Reptiles of the Philippines
Reptiles described in 1992